Port Washington is a hamlet and census-designated place (CDP) on the Cow Neck Peninsula in the Town of North Hempstead, in Nassau County, on the North Shore of Long Island, in New York. The hamlet is the anchor community of the Greater Port Washington area. The population was 16,753 at the 2020 census.

History 
Much of the Port Washington area was initially settled by colonists in 1644, after they purchased land from the people of the Matinecock Nation.

In the 1870s, Port Washington became an important sand-mining town; it had the largest sandbank east of the Mississippi and easy barge access to Manhattan. Some 140 million cubic yards of local sand were used for concrete for New York skyscrapers (including the Empire State and Chrysler buildings), in addition to the New York City Subway. In 1998, the sand mines were redeveloped as Harbor Links – a golf course for North Hempstead residents.

In 1930, Port Washington tried to incorporate itself as a city, which would have had the same boundaries as the Port Washington Union Free School District's, excluding Sands Point, which had already incorporated itself as a village. This plan ultimately failed when the bill was killed after Baxter Estates, Flower Hill, and Manorhaven incorporated themselves as villages in order to retain home rule of their respective areas.

In the late 1930s, prior to the opening of the Marine Air Terminal at LaGuardia Airport, Port Washington was Pan-American World Airways' New York base for their Yankee Clipper Boeing B-314 flying boats; the waters of Manhasset Bay were ideal for flying boat operations. Common destinations served included London, Southampton (UK), the Azores, and Bermuda.

Geography

The hamlet is bordered on two sides with bodies of water: Manhasset Bay on its western side and Hempstead Harbor on its eastern side.

Port Washington is located on the Cow Neck Peninsula.

Two enclaves exist above the northern portions of the main, contiguous part of the hamlet.

Climate 
Port Washington has a hot-summer humid continental climate (Dfa), bordering on a humid subtropical climate (Cfa). Average monthly temperatures in the central CDP range from 31.8° F in January to 75.3° F in July.

The hardiness zone is 7b, except on the north-to-south ridge where it is 7a.

Greater Port Washington area 
The Greater Port Washington area is home to four incorporated villages in their entirety, in addition to the hamlet of Port Washington: 

 Baxter Estates
 Manorhaven
 Port Washington North
 Sands Point

Additionally, the Greater Port Washington area also includes part of the Incorporated Village of Flower Hill (which is split between the Greater Manhasset, Greater Port Washington, and Greater Roslyn areas), as well as a small part of the Village of Plandome Manor (which is split between the Greater Manhasset and Port Washington areas).

Economy 

There are numerous small stores in Port Washington with 6 shopping centers, 4 strip malls and an industrial complex on the east side of Port Washington next to Hempstead Harbor, off West Shore Road. Entertainment One, NPD Group, Pall, and Systemax, as well as a Hilton Garden Inn are located in that industrial complex.

Business improvement district 
Additionally, the entirety of the hamlet is located within the Greater Port Washington Business Improvement District's boundaries.

Demographics

2010 Census
As of the 2010 census, the population was 15,846. The racial makeup of the population was 82.2% White 74.7% Non-Hispanic White, 2.4% African American, 0.2% Native American, 8% Asian, 0.0% Pacific Islander, 4.8% from other races, and 2.4% from two or more races. Hispanic or Latino people of any race were 13.4% of the population. The median income for households in Port Washington, New York is $127,813, while the mean household income is $189,892.

2000 Census
As of the census of 2000, there were 15,215 people, 5,521 households, and 4,168 families residing in the CDP. The population density was 3,613.7 per square mile (1,395.4/km). There were 5,662 housing units at an average density of 1,344.8/sq mi (519.3/km). The racial makeup of the CDP was 85.97% White, 2.81% African American, 0.11% Native American, 6.07% Asian, 0.02% Pacific Islander, 3.15% from other races, and 1.86% from two or more races. Hispanic or Latino people of any race were 11.20% of the population.

There were 5,521 households, out of which 36.3% had children under the age of 18 living with them, 62.9% were married couples living together, and 24.5% were non-families. Of all households, 20.4% were made up of individuals, and 10.4% had someone living alone who was 65 years of age or older. The average household size was 2.73 and the average family size was 3.15.

In the CDP, the population was spread out, with 25.3% under the age of 18, 5.0% from 18 to 24, 28.3% from 25 to 44, 26.4% from 45 to 64, and 15.0% who were 65 years of age or older. The median age was 40 years. For every 100 females, there were 90.9 males. For every 100 females age 18 and over, there were 87.5 males. The median income for a household in the CDP was $105,837 and the median income for a family was $122,646. Males had a median income of $91,024 versus $59,299 for females. The per capita income for the CDP was $53,815. About 3.1% of families and 4.7% of the population were below the poverty line, including 3.5% of those under age 18 and 5.0% of those age 65 or over.

Government

Town representation 
Port Washington, an unincorporated area within the Town of North Hempstead, is directly governed by said Town. It is located entirely within the Town of North Hempstead's 6th council district, which as of August 2022 is represented on the North Hempstead Town Council by Mariann Dalimonte (D–Port Washington).

Representation in higher government

Nassau County representation 
Port Washington is located in Nassau County's 11th Legislative district, which as of August 2022 is represented in the Nassau County Legislature by Delia DiRiggi-Whitton (D–Glen Cove).

New York State representation

New York State Assembly 
Port Washington is located within the New York State Assembly's 16th Assembly district, which as of August 2022 is represented by Gina Sillitti (D–Manorhaven).

New York State Senate 
Port Washington is located in the New York State Senate's 7th State Senate district, which as of August 2022 is represented in the New York State Senate by Anna Kaplan (D–North Hills).

Federal representation

United States Congress 
Port Washington is located in New York's 3rd congressional district, which as of January 2023 is represented in the United States Congress by George Santos (R–New York).

United States Senate 
Like the rest of New York, Port Washington is represented in the United States Senate by Charles Schumer (D) and Kirsten Gillibrand (D).

Politics 
In the 2016 U.S. presidential election, the majority of Port Washington voters voted for Hillary Clinton (D).

Parks and recreation 

 Blumenfeld Family Park
 Harbor Links
 Merriman Park (Manhasset Bay Park District residents only)
 North Hempstead Aerodrome
 North Hempstead Beach Park
 Alvan Petrus Park
 Sand Miner's Monument
 Sunset Park
 Town Dock Park

Park district 

A small portion of Port Washington is located within a park district, named the Manhasset Bay Park District. This special district, which is operated by the Town of North Hempstead, covers the hamlet's Manhasset Bay Estates subdivision, as well as a portion of the Plandome Country Club in the adjacent, incorporated village, Plandome Manor.

The Manhasset Bay Park District is responsible for operating and maintaining Merriman Park, located on the former site of the Port Washington Union Free School District's Merriman School; the park is open exclusively to residents of the Manhasset Bay Park District.

Yacht clubs
 Manhasset Bay Yacht Club
 North Shore Yacht Club
 Port Washington Yacht Club

The former Knickerbocker Yacht Club was also located within the hamlet.

Education

School district 

Port Washington is located within the boundaries of (and is thus served by) the Port Washington Union Free School District. Additionally, a small portion of the hamlet's southeastern corner is located within the boundaries of the Roslyn Union Free School District. However, there are no homes in the area within the Roslyn UFSD's boundaries, and as such, all students who reside within the hamlet and attend public schools go to Port Washington's schools. 

In 2022, the Port Washington UFSD's high school, Paul D. Schreiber Senior High School, was ranked #733 nationally out of 17,843 schools and #77 in New York High Schools out of 1,212 schools.

Library district 
Port Washington is located entirely within the boundaries of the Port Washington Library District.

Infrastructure

Transportation

Road 
One state road passes through and directly serves Port Washington: Port Washington Boulevard (NY 101). Other major roads within the hamlet include Harbor Road, Mackey Avenue, Main Street, Murray Avenue, North Plandome Road, Radcliff Avenue, Sandy Hollow Road, South Bayles Avenue, West Shore Road/Beacon Hill Road, and Willowdale Avenue.

Parking District 
Port Washington, in its entirety, is located within the boundaries of (and is thus served by) the Town of North Hempstead's Port Washington Parking District – a special district. Several of the facilities operated by the district are located within the hamlet.

Rail 

Port Washington is the terminus of the Port Washington Branch of the Long Island Rail Road, which opened for passengers in 1898.

Bus 
The n23 bus operated by Nassau Inter-County Express, which runs from Manorhaven to the Mineola Intermodal Center in Mineola, serves Port Washington, running along Main Street and Port Washington Boulevard.

Additionally, NICE's Port Washington Shuttle provides local service in the hamlet and throughout the Greater Port Washington area, with limited service to the Village of Roslyn, which is located slightly southeast of Port Washington.

Utilities

Natural gas 
National Grid USA provides natural gas to homes and businesses that are hooked up to natural gas lines in Port Washington.

Power 
PSEG Long Island provides power to all homes and businesses within Port Washington.

Sewage 
Port Washington is located within the boundaries of (and is thus served by) the Port Washington Water Pollution Control District, which operates the sanitary sewer system serving the hamlet.

Water 
The Port Washington Water District provides water for the heavy majority of the hamlet, with the exception being the portion of the hamlet located within the Roslyn Union Free School District's boundaries, which is served by the Roslyn Water District.

Healthcare and emergency services

Healthcare 
There are no hospitals located within Port Washington. The nearest hospital to the hamlet is St. Francis Hospital in Flower Hill.

Fire 
The heavy majority of Port Washington is located within the boundaries of (and is thus served by) the Port Washington Fire District, with the exception being the portion of the hamlet located within the Roslyn Union Free School District's boundaries, which is located within the boundaries of (and is thus served by) the Roslyn Fire District.

Police 
The Port Washington Police District provides police protection for the heavy majority of the hamlet, with the exception being the portion of the hamlet located within the Roslyn Union Free School District's boundaries, which is served by the Sixth Precinct of the Nassau County Police Department.

Landmarks 
The Thomas Dodge Homestead, William Landsberg House, Main Street School, and the Monfort Cemetery are listed on the National Register of Historic Places.

Notable people
 John Fasano (1961-2014), screenwriter and director.
 William H. Folwell (1924-2022), American Episcopal prelate.
 Lucy Fradkin (born 1953), visual artist.
 Howard Gould (1871–1959), financier.
 Bob Griffin (born 1980), American-Israeli basketball player, and English Literature professor.
 William Randolph Hearst (1863–1951), publisher.
 Craig M. Johnson (born 1971), former New York State senator.
 Dave Kerpen (born 1976), serial entrepreneur, New York Times best-selling author, global keynote speaker.
 Katie Lowes (born 1982), actress.
 Margaret Marian McPartland (1918-2013), English-born jazz pianist.
 Evelyn Mulry Moore (1942–2012), wheelchair athlete.
 Nancy Overton (1926-2009), singer.
 Susan Quittmeyer, opera singer.
 Anthony Scaramucci (born 1964), founder of SkyBridge Capital; former White House Communications Director to President Donald Trump.
 Richard Shindell (born 1960), singer-songwriter; grew up in Port Washington.
 Sean Spicer (born 1971), 30th White House Press Secretary.
 Jean Swain (1923-2000), singer.
 Jon "Stugotz" Weiner (born 1972), co-host of The Dan Le Batard Show with Stugotz.
 Burt Young (born 1940), actor best known for appearing in Rocky and its sequels.

See also

 Port Washington Play Troupe
 Port Washington Parking District
 Port Washington Water Pollution Control District

References

External links

 Port Washington Chamber of Commerce official website
 Port Washington Public Library

Census-designated places in New York (state)
Hamlets in New York (state)
Long Island Sound
Town of North Hempstead, New York
Census-designated places in Nassau County, New York
Hamlets in Nassau County, New York
Populated coastal places in New York (state)